Right Now, You're in the Best of Hands. And If Something Isn't Quite Right, Your Doctor Will Know in a Hurry is the debut album by the post-hardcore band Bear vs. Shark.

It is commonly referred to as "Right Now, You're in the Best of Hands..." due to its long name. The name of the album is derived from a sign that singer Marc Paffi saw and thought was interesting.

The first vinyl pressing of the album featured two bonus tracks, which appear at the beginning of the album as opposed to the end of it. The vinyl version also has completely different artwork than the CD.

The album was pressed a second time on the UK's Big Scary Records and was limited to 250 hand-numbered copies.

Track listing

First pressing: 1000 copies
250 half and half light blue/light yellow
250 half and half green/clear
250 half and half purple/white
250 one side white/one side black

Second pressing: 250 copies
250 Red/black haze

Personnel
Bear vs. Shark
 Marc Paffi – lead vocals, guitar, keyboards
 Derek Kiesgen – guitar, bass
 Mike Muldoon – guitar, bass, keyboards
 John Gaviglio – guitar, bass, backing vocals
 Brandon Moss – drums

Additional
 Brad Blackwood – mastering
 Jason Mareydt – artwork
 Marc Paffi – artwork
 Joe Pedulla – mixing
 Arun Venkatesh – engineer

References

2003 debut albums
Bear vs. Shark albums
Equal Vision Records albums